The Miss Hawaii competition is the pageant that selects the representative for the State of Hawaii in the Miss America pageant, and the name of the title held by that winner.  Hawaii first competed at Miss America in 1948 and has twice won the Miss America title, in 1992 and 2001.

The current Miss Hawaii is Lauren Teruya of Honolulu who was crowned on May 14, 2022, at the Ala Moana Hotel in Honolulu. She competed for the title of Miss America 2023 at the Mohegan Sun in Uncasville, Connecticut in December 2022 where she placed in the Top 11.

Gallery of past titleholders

Results summary
The following is a visual summary of the past results of Miss Hawaii titleholders at the national Miss America pageants/competitions. The year in parentheses indicates the year of the national competition during which a placement and/or award was garnered, not the year attached to the contestant's state title.

Placements
 Miss Americas: Carolyn Suzanne Sapp (1992), Angela Perez Baraquio (2001)
 1st runners-up: Kanoelani Gibson (2004)
 2nd runners-up: Susan D. Pickering (1964), Jalee Fuselier (2011)
 3rd runners-up: N/A
 4th runners-up: Patricia Lei Anderson (1963)
 Top 7: Raeceen Anuenue Woolford (2010)
 Top 10: Beverly Kathleen Rivera (1953), Barbara Mamo Vieira (1956), Jere Wright (1957), Joan Whitney Vine (1962), Leina'ala Ann Teruya (1965), Sheryl Hung Lan Lokelani Akaka (1970), Debbie Nakanelua (1985), Desiree Moana Cruz (1989), Kanoe Aberegg (1994), Melissa Ann Short (1997), Erika Kauffman (1998), Pilialoha Gaison (2007), Nicole Fox (2009)
 Top 11: Lauren Teruya (2023)
 Top 15: Bee Jay Johnston (1949), Nicole Holbrook (2020)

Awards

Preliminary awards
 Preliminary Lifestyle and Fitness: Barbara Mamo Vieira (1956), Jere Wright (1957), Kathleen Puanani O'Sullivan (1971), Carolyn Suzanne Sapp (1992), Melissa Ann Short (1997), Erika Kauffman (1998), Angela Perez Baraquio (2001), Jalee Fuselier (2011)
 Preliminary Talent: Patricia Lei Anderson (1963), Melissa Ann Short (1997), Kanoelani Gibson (2004), Pilialoha Gaison (2007), Lauren Cheape (2012)

Non-finalist awards
 Non-finalist Talent: Gertrude Kapi'olani Miller (1955), Aurora Joan Ka'awa (1972), Jeanne Miyamoto (1986), Cheryl Bartlett (1987), Cheryl Akemi Toma (1991), Jennifer Hera (1999), Lauren Cheape (2012), Penelope Ng Pack (2019)

Other awards
 Miss Congeniality: Judith Anne Deegan (1968), Yun Tau Zane (1948), Dell-Fin Kala’upaona Po’aha (1951), Claire Katherine Heen (1952), Barbara Mamo Vieira (1956), Gordean Leilehua Lee (1960), Kanoelehua Kaumeheiwa (1974), Coline-Helen Kaualoku Aiu (1975) (tie), Malika Dudley (2006), Raeceen Anuenue Woolford (2010), Jeanné Kapela (2015)
 Children's Miracle Network (CMN) Miracle Maker Award: Lauren Cheape (2012)
 Dr. David B. Allman Medical Scholarship: Ligaya Stice (1990)
 Charles & Theresa Brown Scholarship: Stephanie Steuri (2015)
 Quality of Life Award Finalists: Nicole Fox (2009), Lauren Cheape (2012)
  STEM Scholarship Finalists: Allison Chu (2017)
 Women in Business Scholarship Award Winners: Penelope Ng Pack (2019)
 Women in Business Scholarship Award 1st runners-up: Nicole Holbrook (2020)

Winners

Notes

References

External links
 

Hawaii culture
Hawaii
Women in Hawaii
Recurring events established in 1948
1948 establishments in Hawaii
Annual events in Hawaii